The Eltanin Antenna  is an object photographed on the sea floor by the Antarctic oceanographic research ship USNS Eltanin in 1964, while photographing the sea bottom west of Cape Horn.

Other authorities have suggested that the object photographed by the Eltanin was an unusual carnivorous sponge, Chondrocladia concrescens (formerly Cladorhiza concrescens).

History
The 1,850-ton displacement vessel Eltanin was originally launched in 1957, and served with the United States Navy as a cargo-carrying icebreaker. In 1962, she was reclassified as an Oceanographic Research Ship and became the world's first dedicated Antarctic research vessel, a role she filled until 1975.

The first public mention of the unusual subject of the photograph was a news item which appeared in the New Zealand Herald on 5 December 1964, under the heading "Puzzle Picture From Sea Bed". In 1968, author Brad Steiger wrote an article for Saga Magazine, in which he claimed that the Eltanin had photographed "an astonishing piece of machinery... very much like the cross between a TV antenna and a telemetry antenna".

Identification as sponge

In 2003, Tom DeMary, a researcher in underwater acoustics, contacted oceanographer A. F. Amos, who had been aboard the USNS Eltanin in the 1960s, and in turn Amos referred DeMary to the 1971 book The Face of the Deep by Bruce C. Heezen and Charles D. Hollister. Hollister had already identified the mysterious object as Cladorhiza concrescens, a species of carnivorous sponge. Heezen and Hollister's book reproduces the photograph taken by the USNS Eltanin as well as a redrawn version of a drawing by Alexander Agassiz which originally appeared in his 1888 Three Cruises of the Blake. Hollister and Heezen describe Cladorhiza concrescens as a sponge which "somewhat resembles a space-age microwave antenna", while Agassiz described the sponges as having "a long stem ending in ramifying roots, sunk deeply into the mud. The stem has nodes with four to six club-like appendages. They evidently cover like bushes extensive tracts of the bottom."

References

Further reading
 
 

Earth mysteries